The 1927 Liège–Bastogne–Liège was the 17th edition of the Liège–Bastogne–Liège cycle race and was held on 10 April 1927. The race started and finished in Liège. The race was won by Maurice Raes.

General classification

References

1927
1927 in Belgian sport